Gymnemopsis is a plant genus in the family Apocynaceae, first described as a genus in 1912. It is native to Indochina.

Species
 Gymnemopsis calcicola Kerr - Thailand
 Gymnemopsis pierrei Costantin - Vietnam

References 

Apocynaceae genera
Asclepiadoideae